The Tarleton State Texans women's basketball team represents Tarleton State University, located in Stephenville, Texas. Through the 2019–20 season, the team competed in NCAA Division II as a member of the Lone Star Conference. The Texans will begin a four-year transition to NCAA Division I in July 2020, joining the Western Athletic Conference.

The Texans will make their Division I debut under seventh-year head coach Misty Wilson.

The team plays its games at Wisdom Gym on its campus in Stephenville.

Postseason

NCAA Division II
The Texans made nine appearances in the NCAA Division II women's basketball tournament. They had a combined record of 2–9.

NAIA Division I
The TexAnns made one appearance in the NAIA Division I women's basketball tournament, with a combined record of 0–1.

AIAW Division III
The TexAnns made two appearances in the AIAW National Division III basketball tournament. They had a combined record of 1–2.

References

External links